Kalbadevi is an old neighbourhood in Mumbai (Bombay), India. It is named after Goddess Kalbadevi, the Hindu Goddess. Kalbadevi area is one of the busiest areas during peak hours. The area has mostly traders in watches, bicycles, steel utensils, etc. It has a large Gujarati population.

Business centre
Kalbadevi is within walking distance from CST, Masjid Bunder and Marine Lines. The traders, buyers and visitors living in suburbs depend on these three railway stations to reach Kalbadevi.

Location
Kalbadevi Road  starts near Metro Cinema and continues up to Bhuleshwar Road and further to the Khetwadi road. There are a number of book shops for old and new books. One of these, the New and Secondhand Bookshop was founded in 1905. An access to the two cloth wholesale markets, Mulji Jetha Market and Mangaldas Market, are the main cloth markets in South Mumbai from Hanuman Galli, which starts at Kalbadevi Road. At the further end of Kalbadevi, near Bhuleshwar Road, is the Cotton Exchange, the market for cotton trade.

Hotels
Hotel Surti is at the intersection of Bhuleshwar Road and Kalbadevi Road. Other restaurants on Kalbadevi include Anand Bhavan and Krishna Murari near the Old Hanuman Lane in the "middle" portion along the length of Kalbadevi Road. Towards Metro there are two other restaurants - Raj Mahal and Pushpa Vihar and also Thali restaurant. There is a prominent chain of Hotels or Lodging House in this area named Adarsh Hotel Group. They are having their three hotels in Kalbadevi Road i.e. Adarsh Hotel, Hotel Adarsh Palace, Old Hanuman Lane and Adarsh Baug, Dr. Atmaram Merchant Road. A market has also been developed for designer sarees and readymade garments. G. T. Hospital, Cama Hospital and Bombay Hospital are near Kalbadevi Road.

Parsi Fire temples and market place
Being close to a Parsi fire temple, many Parsis live near Metro Cinema in Kalbadevi. Parsi Dairy on Princess Street is a very old establishment in the area. It has undergone restructuring to keep up with the modern times. Publishers like R. R. Sheth & Co. and  Navbharat Sahitya Mandir are on Princess Street in this area.

Old Residential area
Kalbadevi used to be a residential area. Abdul Rehman Street, Princess Street, and Bhuleshwar Road were occupied by families. As the price of real estate went up, more and more people opted to leave the area and move towards the northern parts of Mumbai.

Kalbadevi temple
The Kalbadevi temple, after which this neighbourhood is named was relocated twice. It is believed that the original temple was located in Mahim, but the image of the goddess was kept hidden for five hundred years. After being found, it was installed in this neighbourhood. It was relocated again  when the Government decided to widen the road for laying a tramline. The original structure was demolished and the government financed the entire expenditure for the construction of the present structure. The management of the present temple was handed over to Raghunath Joshi after relocation.

kalbadevi fire hazard
In the major fire hazard  developed in Kalbadevi area, during May, 2015, Shri Amin, died in the line of duty, had demonstrated exemplary courage while discharging his duty during the massive fire at Kalbadevi in Mumbai last week. He risked his own life.

See also
 Jama Masjid, Mumbai
 Adarsh Hotel, junction P. H. Purohit Marg & Kalbadevi Road

References

Neighbourhoods in Mumbai